Cameron Barr is an Australian rules football umpire currently officiating in the Australian Football League.

Before umpiring in the AFL, he umpired in the North East Australian Football League, officiating in the 2015 and '17 Grand Finals. He was appointed to the AFL umpire rookie list in 2016, and made his debut, as an emergency umpire replacing an injured Troy Pannell, in a match between Sydney and Greater Western Sydney in Round 3, 2018.

References

External links 
 Cameron Barr at AFL Tables

Living people
Australian Football League umpires
Year of birth missing (living people)